Club Atlético Uruguay is an Argentine football club, located in Concepción del Uruguay, Entre Ríos Province. The team currently plays at Torneo Argentino B, the regionalised 4th division of Argentine football league system.

The club were founded on 1 September 1904 and played at the highest level of Argentine football only once, the National tournament of 1984. Atlético Uruguay finished bottom of its group and only managed one draw in six matches played, as well as being heavily defeated 5–0 and 6–0 by River Plate and 7–0 by Huracán.

References

External links
BDFA club profile

Football clubs in Entre Ríos Province
Association football clubs established in 1904
1904 establishments in Argentina